Dublin tramways was a system of trams in Dublin, Ireland, which commenced line-laying in 1871, and began service in 1872, following trials in the mid-1860s. Established by a number of companies, the majority of the system was eventually operated by forms of the Dublin United Tramways Company (DUTC), dominated for many years by William Martin Murphy.  Most of the services ran within the city centre and near suburbs, with the majority of major suburbs served (and many of the remainder handled by mainline rail).  Additionally, there were two longer-range services, one reaching the "excursion" destination of Poulaphouca Falls, and two services concerning Howth.

Heavy usage lasted from the late 19th century into the 1920s. The tram system was also central to the Dublin Lockout, which caused major distress within the city.

Elements of the system went out of service from the mid-1920s, in part overtaken by the bus. The decline of the trams accelerated in the 1940s and the last trams ran on 9 July 1949 in Dublin city and in 1959 on Howth Head, near Dublin.

History

Background and legislation
The tram concept arrived in Ireland in the early years of railway development, and the first related projects concerned attempts to link major city train stations with a light railway.  The legislation on this topic was the model for the first of the Irish Tramways Acts (which differed somewhat from those of England and Wales, or Scotland), the Tramways (Ireland) Act, 1860 (c. 152).  One feature of this law was that each establishment of a tramway operation required approvals including those of the Irish Privy Council, and an Act of the Imperial Parliament, onerous and expensive provisions.  This and other provisions argued to be impractical led to modification by the Tramways (Ireland) Amendment Act, 1861 (c. 102).

The next relevant legislation was the Special Act, the Dublin Tramways Company Act of 1871, setting up the first company to actually deliver service, and the associated similarly named act of 1872, finalising initial routes and other rules.  In parallel the main legislation was modified by the Tramways (Ireland) Amendment Act of 1871 (c. 114).  A further Dublin Tramways Act followed in 1876 (c. 65), and the Tramways (Ireland) Amendment Act of 1881 (c. 17), provided for the formation of tramway ventures by way of simplified procedures.  In the meantime, the Relief of Distress Act of 1880 allowed for local authority support of tramway ventures (previously some provisions existed for such support for railways only).

From 1889, a new focus came to legislation on this topic, beginning with the Light Railways Act of 1889, also known as "Balfour's Act", which aimed to encourage tram-like or light rail systems in poorer areas, and increased the potential for government to support such projects.

Formation
The first Dublin trams were horse drawn.  In the early years, there were several operators, including (with the abbreviations by which they were often known):
 The Dublin Tramways Company (DTC), which acquired the rights of the City of Dublin Tramways Co. and the Rathmines omnibuses, and started laying lines in 1871, commencing service to Terenure on 1 February 1872; notably, in the run-up to launch and for some time after, there were concerted objections to the placing of rails in or on the road, with fears about carriage accidents (a similar process occurred later when steam trams were proposed), and some of these objections were continued during and after construction
 The North Dublin Street Tramways Company (NDST), formed 1875, with a line from Nelson's Pillar to Drumcondra commencing in 1877
 The Dublin Central Tramways Company (DCT), formed 1878, with authority to build a line from College Green to Rathfarnham with branches to Ranelagh, Rathgar, Rathmines and Clonskeagh, and with a line commencing 22 June 1879, from Nelson's Pillar to Terenure via Harold's Cross

By 1880, with many of the major districts of Dublin being served by the above three tram companies, William Martin Murphy, a founding shareholder of the Dublin Central Tramways Company, founded the Dublin United Tramways Company (DUTC) in January 1881, with himself as manager, and his father-in-law as chairman, and arranged the merger of the three companies, uniting 32 "route miles" under DUTC control.

 The Dublin Southern Districts Tramways Company (DSDTC), formed 1878
 The Blackrock and Kingstown Tramway (BKT), formed 1883

In 1878, the DSDTC was acquired by the Imperial Tramways Company, who in 1893 secured an Act of Parliament allowing them to purchase the BKT, and to use electrical and mechanical power. In mid-1896, the combined operation of these two companies, including the recently acquired legal authority to use electricity, was sold to the British Thomson-Houston Company, which almost immediately in turn sold it to the DUTC.

Electrification and peak operation

Discussions towards electrification began in the late 1890s, but this was opposed by Dublin Corporation, among others. An American panel also opposed the overhead line in densely populated areas.

The Dublin United Tramways Company, with the acquisition of the Dublin Southern Tramways, which had earlier the same year started the first electrical tram line in Ireland, reversed long-standing policy favouring horse-drawn trams, and, having reorganised as the Dublin United Tramways Company (1896) Ltd., proceeded with a rapid electrification. As part of a deal with Dublin Corporation, the DUTC agreed to pay them £500 per route mile for 40 years and a minimum of £10,000 per year when the system was fully electrified.

In 1911 the system had 330 trams.

At its peak, the system was known as technically innovative, and was described in 1904 as "one of the most impressive in the world", so that representatives of other cities from around the world came to inspect it and its electric operation.

The Lockout

In 1913, the Dublin tram system was central to the Dublin lock-out, when DUTC members walked off the job over the refusal of William Martin Murphy to allow some workers to join the Irish Transport and General Workers' Union

Decline and closure
The DUTC opened its first bus route in 1925, progressively replacing the trams until the closure of their last route, the No. 8 to Dalkey, on 10 July 1949. According to then Minister for Justice Seán Mac Eoin,  "A force of 60 guards, including 2 superintendents, 1 inspector, 8 sergeants and 3 motor-cyclists[,] were placed on duty over the route," but they were unable to protect the last tram from damage by souvenir hunters. 

Following the Transport Act 1944, control of the DUTC was vested in the newly formed Córas Iompair Éireann (CIÉ). At the time the DUTC had 113 trams remaining.

The Hill of Howth Tramway was transferred to CIÉ in 1958 and closed on 31 May 1959. It was the last tram to run in Ireland, until the Luas tram system opened in 2004.

Reasons for decline
A number of factors combined in the decline of Dublin's tram system. The advent of buses and large-scale competition meant that buses often ran the same routes as the trams and would jump in front to "grab" customers, and buses were able to move into Dublin's expanding hinterland more quickly and at less cost than the trams, and the belief that trams were outdated and old technology, leading to declining use. Meanwhile, the DUTC's takeover of many bus operators left the DUTC with a large number of buses, which were used and expanded to areas of Dublin with no tram service, and buses eventually became the DUTC's core business. There was a belief that buses were cheaper to run than trams and that the system was in a poor state of repair. Britain's 1930 Royal Commission on Transport similarly actively advised against trams and for their replacement with buses.

After closure
After closure the system was still being discussed in the Dáil until at least 1960 when the issue of removal of the old tram tracks was raised.

Lines and companies
The original tram-related legislation identified proposed lines by number, with a detailed route description, but these numbers were not widely used.

Dublin United Tramways Company

In 1910, there were seventeen Dublin United Tramways Company (DUTC) routes, each identified with a different symbol (since 1903), and named for their terminus stations. Route numbers replaced the symbols from 1918, rising from 1 at Ringsend to 30 for Dollymount (and 31 for Howth, shared with another company) in a circuit around the city. Both the original routes and their numbers were the basis of some of the later bus routes and numbers.

Non-DUTC operations
The Dublin region had six other tram companies in the early 20th century, two operating back-to-back lines to Lucan and Leixlip, and two similarly in the direction of Blessington and Poulaphouca.  The remaining two operated lines relating to Howth, one circuiting Howth Head and one connecting the DUTC system to Howth village and harbour.  The Lucan and Leixlip lines were absorbed by the DUTC in 1927, and the coastal service to Howth was part-DUTC for many years.

Clontarf and Hill of Howth Tramroad

The Clontarf and Hill of Howth Tramroad (C&HoHT), incorporated by a Private Local Act, having considered both a coastal route and one via Raheny, had a single line, from Dollymount to Howth Harbour, which opened on 26 July 1900. It operated as an extension of the DUTC lines and shared operation with the DUTC, providing a route from Nelson's Pillar to Howth.  It remained legally independent until closure, being wound-up on 1 July 1941, but was operationally integrated with the DUTC, at least from the second decade of the century.

Dublin and Blessington Steam Tramway
Although the DBST connected with the DUTC system at Terenure, through-running was not allowed, as Dublin Corporation prohibited the operation of steam trams within the city.

The line was actually one of the first proposed in Ireland, as the Dublin and Baltinglass Tramway, but the costs of setting up operation under the early legislation were deemed prohibitive, and it was only after its promoters obtained the Dublin Tramways Act, 1881 (c. 17 of that year) that work really started.

Dublin and Wicklow county councils guaranteed this line, Kildare however, despite usage from the direction of Harristown (and Kilcullen and Ballymore Eustace) refused to be involved.  It came under the administration of the Dublin County Surveyor in 1916, after years of profitable operation ended in 1914, and later under a committee of management.  The potential inclusion of the line into the new Great Southern Railways entity was debated in the Dáil in 1924, but the government successfully opposed the idea.  The DBST was closed by the Dublin and Blessington Steam Tramway (Abandonment) Act, 1932, after years of being a burden on ratepayers, especially in the much more sparsely populated Wicklow.

Blessington and Poulaphouca Steam Tramway

The Blessington and Poulaphouca Steam Tramway (1895–1927), was a  extension of the DBST from Blessington to Poulaphouca, built and operated by a separate company.

Dublin and Lucan Steam Tramway
The Dublin and Lucan Steam Tramway (DLST), authorised by an Order in Council under the Tramways Act, which commenced in 1880, opened, mostly on a roadside reservation, to Chapelizod in June 1881, Palmerstown in November 1881, and to Lucan in 1883.

Legally a railway, it was taken over and supported by the government during World War I under the Defence of the Realm Act (DORA). However, this ended in 1921 and facing increasing competition from the Tower Bus Co., the D&LER's financial position deteriorated.

In 1925, after their failure to be amalgamated into the GSR under the Railways Act 1924, the line was closed, going into liquidation.  Following discussions, and enabled by two acts of the Irish Free State, the D&LER was bought up by the DUTC.  The lines were regauged to Dublin's  only as far as Lucan, a new line was fitted in Chapelizod, and it reopened as a DUTC route in 1928.

Extensions beyond Lucan

Lucan and Leixlip Steam Tramway
The Lucan, Leixlip and Celbridge Steam Tramway Company was established to build lines from the Lucan terminus to Leixlip and Celbridge (branching off just outside Leixlip). The Lucan and Leixlip Steam Tramway (L&LST) extension was built, and operated between 1890 and 1898.

Lucan and Leixlip Electric Railway
A new line was laid close to the original steam line, over a decade later, under an Order in Council, the Lucan and Leixlip Electric Railway Order, 1910, by a completely new company. This was opened as an electric line in 1910, and was leased to the (D&LER) in August 1911.

When the DUTC bought up the insolvent D&LER, they also purchased the L&LER from its shareholders, and although required to refit and reopen it in like manner, following objections from Dublin County Council the extension beyond Lucan was not reopened.

Interconnection of the Lucan / Leixlip and city trams

While not originally connected, the Dublin terminus of the Lucan line was 12 yards from the Park Gate terminus of the DUTC lines, on Conyngham Road, and the two were connected after the purchase by the DUTC.

Hill of Howth Tramway 

Operated by the Great Northern Railway (GNR), the Hill of Howth Tramway comprised a single route, from Sutton railway station to Howth railway station over Howth Head by way of the Summit.  The tramway was opened under the Great Northern Railway (Ireland) Act of 1897 (and the Tramways Acts), the first line segment, from Sutton to the Summit, on 17 July 1901, the remainder to Howth on 1 August 1901.

Industrial services

Guinness Brewery tramways
The Guinness Brewery tramways was a system of industrial tramways that operated on and around the site of St. James's Gate Brewery Two different gauges were used; a narrow gauge tramway and a broad gauge line. Neither were for public use.

The narrow gauge tramway

The narrow gauge tramway operated on and around the site of St. James's Gate Brewery. The tramway had direct access to the Liffey via a specially constructed quay and made use of a spiral tunnel to overcome a height difference on the brewery site. The tunnel cost £3,000 and construction spanned 1877–1878

The broad gauge tramway

The broad gauge tramway connected the brewery with the goods yards of Heuston Station. The broad gauge system closed on 15 May 1965.

Dublin tramways in literature
Dublin tramways, routes, tracks and the DUTC are mentioned several times in Ulysses by James Joyce

Today
Around the city it is still possible to see buildings associated with the system such as the Blackrock Depot (later the Mazda Europa Centre, now demolished), Dartry Depot, Clonskeagh Depot, Donnybrook Depot (now part of Donnybrook Bus Garage), Dalkey Yard (some track still in-situ), the Sandymount Depot, the Marlborough Street Depot which still features the lettering DUTC or the Power House in Ringsend, and other reminders of the system also exist.  Meanwhile some trams are preserved in the National Museum of Ireland and the National Transport Museum of Ireland (at Howth Castle) and at the National Tramway Museum in the UK. A modern tram system, Luas, opened in 2004.

Gallery

Historic

Modern day

See also

Dublin United Transport Company
Hill of Howth Tramway
Dublin and Blessington Steam Tramway

External sources
Photos of Guinness no. 23 loco & "converter wagon"

Notes and references

1873 establishments in Ireland
Tram transport in the Republic of Ireland
Tramways
Tramways
Dublin